Portchester railway station is situated to the east of Fareham in Hampshire, England,  from . It was first opened by the LSWR in 1848 on their line from Fareham to Portsmouth.

Services 
South Western Railway and Southern operate regular services at Portchester using ,  and  EMUs.

The typical off-peak service in trains per hour is:
 1 tph to  via 
 1 tph to  via 
 2 tph to 

Gallery

References

External links 

Railway stations in Hampshire
DfT Category E stations
Former London and South Western Railway stations
Railway stations in Great Britain opened in 1848
Railway stations served by Govia Thameslink Railway
Railway stations served by South Western Railway
Railway stations served by Great Western Railway